Iván Arturo Torres Riveros (born 27 February 1991) is a Paraguayan professional footballer who plays as a left-back for Paraguayan Primera División side Club Olimpia.

International
He made his Paraguay national football team debut on 5 June 2019, in a friendly against Honduras, as a starter.

Personal life
Torres married Cristina "Vita" Aranda, with whom he had three children. Aranda was shot while attending the Ja'umina Fest music festival at the Jose Asuncion Flores Amphitheatre in San Bernardino on 30 January 2022 and she later died from her injuries. Aranda was one of two people killed as a result of the shooting, and four others were injured.

See also
 Players and Records in Paraguayan Football

References

External links

1991 births
Living people
People from Ñemby
Paraguayan footballers
Paraguay international footballers
Paraguayan expatriate footballers
Association football defenders
Cerro Porteño players
Club Olimpia footballers
Club Atlético Colón footballers
Paraguayan Primera División players
Argentine Primera División players
Expatriate footballers in Argentina
Paraguayan expatriate sportspeople in Argentina